The American South Conference Men's Basketball Player of the Year is a basketball award given to the American South Conference's most outstanding player. Both the conference and the award were short-lived and only handed out from 1988 to 1991. Four recipients received the award, three of which played for the University of New Orleans.  The American South Conference merged with the Sun Belt Conference following the 1990–91 season.

Winners

Winners by school

References

Player
NCAA Division I men's basketball conference players of the year
Awards disestablished in 1991
Awards established in 1988